North Pyongan Province (also spelled North P'yŏngan;) is a western province of North Korea. The province was formed in 1896 from the northern half of the former P'yŏng'an Province, remained a province of Korea until 1945, then became a province of North Korea. Its capital is Sinŭiju. In 2002, Sinŭiju Special Administrative Region—near the city of Sinuiju—was established as a separately governed Special Administrative Region.

Geography
The Yalu River forms the northern border with China's Liaoning province. The province is also bordered on the east by Chagang Province and on the south by South Pyong'an Province. The Sinŭiju Special Administrative Region is located in the western corner of the province, and was created as an administrative entity separate from North Pyongan in 2002. North Pyongan is bounded by water on the west with the Korea Bay and the Yellow Sea.

Administrative divisions
North Pyongan is divided into 3 cities (si) and 22 counties (kun). Each entity is listed below in English, Chosŏn'gŭl, and Hancha.

Gallery

References 

North Pyongan
Provinces of North Korea